The BBC Scotland Sports Personality of the Year (also known as Sportscene Personality of the Year until 1998) was an annual sport award in Scotland. It was organised by BBC Scotland.

History
Between 1984 and 1996 it had its own show similar to the BBC Sports Personality of the Year with postal votes, a live audience and hosted by Dougie Donnelly, Archie Macpherson (until 1989), Hazel Irvine (from 1990) and Rob MacLean and for most years, it was often shown a week before the network version in December. The trophy was made by Caithness Glass with a diamond shape design. In 1997 and in 1998, it was decided by a public telephone vote with the winner being given the award on the usual Sportscene programme on Saturday nights.

Winners

A 1986 team award went to badminton players Dan Travers and Billy Gilliland.

See also
Sport in Scotland
BBC Sports Personality of the Year

References

External links
BBC Scottish Sports Personality of the Year BBC Sport Scotland, December 2003

Scotland
BBC Scotland
Awards established in 1977
1977 establishments in Scotland